The 1998 Bulgarian Cup Final was played at the Vasil Levski National Stadium in Sofia on 13 May 1998, and was contested between the sides of CSKA Sofia and Levski Sofia. The match was won by Levski Sofia, thus they achieved their 20th national cup.

Route to the Final

Match

Details

See also
1997–98 A Group

References

Bulgarian Cup finals
PFC CSKA Sofia matches
PFC Levski Sofia matches
Cup Final